Llorenç Vitrià Barrera (2 February 1908, in Barcelona – 18 June 1941, in Gusen, Austria) was a Spanish boxer who competed in the 1924 Summer Olympics.

In 1924 he was eliminated in the second round of the flyweight class after losing his fight to Jock MacGregor. Due his exile to France after the Spanish Civil War, he was deported to the Mauthausen concentration camp in Austria in 1940 and he died in 1941 in Gusen (an external concentration camp of Mauthausen).

References

External links
profile

1908 births
1941 deaths
Boxers from Barcelona
Flyweight boxers
Olympic boxers of Spain
Boxers at the 1924 Summer Olympics
Spanish male boxers
Exiles of the Spanish Civil War in France
French people who died in Mauthausen concentration camp
Spanish people murdered abroad